Ross Russell may refer to:

Ross Russell (jazz) (1909–2000), American jazz producer and author
Ross Russell (footballer, born 1967), Trinidadian football manager and former goalkeeper
Ross Russell (footballer, born 1992), Trinidadian football left-back